Alizarine yellow may refer to:

 Alizarine Yellow R
 Alizarine Yellow 2G
 Gallacetophenone, also called also Alizarine Yellow C